Nogaevci is a village in the municipality of Gradsko, North Macedonia.

Demographics
On the 1927 ethnic map of Leonhard Schulze-Jena, the village is written as Nogajevci and as a fully Christian Bulgarian village. According to the 2002 census, the village had a total of 239 inhabitants. Ethnic groups in the village include:

Macedonians 236
Albanians 1
Serbs 2

References

Villages in Gradsko Municipality